The 2011 Marion Blue Racers season was the first season for the Continental Indoor Football League (CIFL) franchise. They took over to fill the void in Marion, Ohio, after the Marion Mayhem folded the year before. The franchise couldn't have asked for a more exciting start than their first game on March 5, 2011. Marion entered the 4th quarter trailing 37-23 to the Port Huron Predators. They started their comeback by scoring a touchdown with 10:31 left in the game. Mike Tatum caught a nine-yard touchdown pass from Josh Harris and Tyler Lorenz added the extra point, cutting Port Huron's lead was cut to 37–30. With 3:27 left in the game, Harris ran in from three yards out to tie the game. The game-winning score came on an eight-yard run by Harris with 27 seconds to play. Port Huron quarterback Jim Roth was intercepted by Bryan Williams as time expired to secure the victory. 
On April 2, 2011, the Blue Racers set a CIFL record with 8 rushing touchdowns in a single game, against the Indianapolis Enforcers. 
After the Blue Racers got off to a 3–1 start, Demetrius Ross stepped down from his head coaching position, citing personal reasons. His defensive coordinator, Ryan Terry, took over as head coach, just 2 days before the Blue Racers played their first road game at the Dayton Silverbacks. The Blue Racers went on to an 8–2 regular season record, losing twice to the Cincinnati Commandos. The team defeated the Dayton Silverbacks 53–18 in the league semi-finals, before being defeated by the Commandos again in the 2011 CIFL Championship Game 44–29.

Schedule

Playoff schedule

Standings

Final roster

Regular season

Week 2: vs Port Huron Predators

Week 3: vs Cincinnati Commandos

Week 5: vs Dayton Silverbacks

Week 6: vs Indianapolis Enforcers

Week 7: vs Dayton Silverbacks

Week 8: vs Port Huron Predators

Week 10: vs Chicago Knights

Week 12: vs Indianapolis Enforcers

Week 13: vs Chicago Knights

Week 14: vs Cincinnati Commandos

Playoffs

2 vs 3 Semifinal vs Dayton Silverbacks

2011 CIFL Championship Game: vs. Cincinnati Commandos

References

2011 Continental Indoor Football League season
Marion Blue Racers
Marion Blue Racers